The Low Voltage Directive (LVD) 2006/95/EC is one of the oldest Single Market Directives adopted by the European Union before the "New" or "Global" Approach. The Directive provides common broad objectives for safety regulations, so that electrical equipment approved by any EU member country will be acceptable for use in all other EU countries. The Low Voltage Directive does not supply any specific technical standards that must be met, instead relying on IEC technical standards to guide designers to produce safe products. Products that conform to the general principles of the Low Voltage Directive and the relevant particular safety standards are marked with the CE marking to indicate compliance and acceptance throughout the EU. Conformance is asserted by the manufacturer based on its conformity assessment. 

The new version of Low Voltage Directive version of 2014/35/EU, dated 26 February 2014 and is applicable from 20 April 2016. The new version aligns with the New Legislative Framework of the European Union, though actual technical requirements do not differ much from the older version. But the legal and general requirements have changed significantly (obligations of manufacturers, dealers, marketers) and penalties are called for in the event of infringements of the directive. They must be determined by the respective Member States and should be (literally) effective, proportionate and dissuasive.

Application
The directive covers electrical equipment designed for use with a voltage rating of between 50 and 1000 volts for alternating current (AC) or between 75 and 1500 volts for direct current (DC). Importantly, it does not cover voltages within equipment The directive does not cover components (broadly, this refers to individual electronic components).

Certain classes of equipment, covered by other technical standards, are listed in Annex II of the Directive as excluded from its scope.  These items include medical devices, electricity meters, railway or maritime equipment, and electrical plugs and sockets for domestic use.

UK implementation
In the United Kingdom, the directive is implemented by "The Electrical Equipment (Safety) Regulations 2016"

See also 
 Low voltage
 High voltage

References

External links 
 5 Ways to fail Low Voltage Directive LVD testing – Electronics Weekly

Electrical safety
European Union directives